Tom E. Dahl is an American sound engineer. He was nominated for an Academy Award in the category Best Sound for the film The Witches of Eastwick. He has worked on more than 160 films since 1977.

Selected filmography
 The Witches of Eastwick (1987)

References

External links

Year of birth missing (living people)
Living people
American audio engineers